Sri Rajahmura Lumaya, known in his shortened name Sri Lumay, was the  first Rajah  and the founder of the Indianized Rajahnate of Cebu. According to the epic Aginid, Bayok sa atong Tawarik, a Bisayan epic story, Sri Lumay was a half-Tamil and half Malay minor prince of the Chola dynasty. Sri Lumay was the grandfather of Rajah Humabon. He may be called a semi-legendary figure, since no other written records mentions about Sri Lumay, other than in oral traditions in the Visayan epic story of Anginid.

Legendary accounts

Sri Lumay, or Rajahmura Lumaya, established the Rajahnate of Cebu. He was a prince of the Chola dynasty. Initially, he was commissioned by the Maharajah to establish a base for their army force; instead, he created his own kingdom which he himself ruled with his son, Sri Alho and Sri Ukob; they ruled the south known as Sialo, which included Valladolid, Carcar, up to Santander.

The account of Aginid, Bayok sa atong Tawarik is about Sri Lumay who settled in Sugbo with his son, Sri Alho, ruling the south known as Sialo which included Valladolid, Carcar, up to Santander. Sri Lumay established the city of Singhapala that become the capital of the rajahnate and what is now part of Mabolo in the northern district of Cebu City.

Battle campaigns

Sri Lumay fought the Magalos, or destroyers of peace, Muslim Moro warriors coming from Mindanao, who had been raiding the island of Cebu in search for precious items like gold or ceramics and slaves. Sri Lumay was noted for his strict policies in defending against Moro Muslim raiders and slavers from Mindanao. His use of scorched earth tactics to repel invaders gave rise to the name Kang Sri Lumayang Sugbu (literally "that of Sri Lumay's great fire") to the town, which was later shortened to Sugbu ("scorched earth").

In other folk stories, the problem about the Magalos where already an issue since the time of early Malay settlers during the time of the legendary Datu Daya who build a watch towers to watch the community against the up coming raids.

Death
He died in battle, fighting with the Muslim Moro pirates known as magalos from Mindanao.

Sources
The Anginid epic mentioned Sri Lumay, his works, where he came from, and how he established the rajahnate:

Issue
 Sri Ukob, ruled the north, known as Nahalin, which includes the present towns of Consolacion, Liloan, Compostela, Danao, Carmen, and Bantayan.
 Sri Alho ruled over Sialo, which includes the present-day towns of Carcar and Santander in the southern region of Cebu.

See also
 Datu Daya  - a legendary Malay chief who was one of the early settlers in northern Cebu.
 Rajahnate of Cebu
 Singhapala - the ancient capital of the Rajahnate of Cebu.
 Rajah Humabon
 Cebu City
 Lapu-lapu
 Ferdinand Magellan

References

External links
 http://www.cebu-bluewaters.com/early-cebu-history.html

Filipino paramount rulers
Filipino Hindus
Filipino datus, rajas and sultans
Paramilitary Filipinos
People from Cebu
People of Tamil descent